Supermensch: The Legend of Shep Gordon is a 2013 American documentary film about talent manager Shep Gordon, produced and directed by Mike Myers in his directorial debut.  The film is the account of Gordon's career and his clients such as Alice Cooper, Blondie, Teddy Pendergrass, and Pink Floyd. The film also addresses Gordon's personal life and his interest in cooking, producing films, and his Buddhist beliefs.

The film was screened in the Gala Presentation section at the 2013 Toronto International Film Festival.  It won the audience award for best documentary at the 2014 Sarasota Film Festival,<ref>Wade Tatangelo, "Sarasota Film Festival awards announced", Sarasota Herald-Tribune, April 12, 2014.</ref> and also screened at the 2014 Tribeca Film Festival.  It was released theatrically on June 6, 2014.

Cast
 Shep Gordon as himself
 Alice Cooper as himself
 Michael Douglas as himself
 Emeril Lagasse as himself
 Anne Murray as herself
 Willie Nelson as himself
 Derek Shook as himself
 Sylvester Stallone as himself 
 Mike Myers as himself

ReceptionSupermensch: The Legend of Shep Gordon received generally positive reviews upon its release. Review aggregator Rotten Tomatoes gave the film a "Certified Fresh" approval rating of 78% based on reviews from 79 critics. The site's critical consensus reads: "Its unabashedly positive tone may strike some viewers as disingenuous, but even if Supermensch doesn't tell the whole story, it's an undeniably entertaining one." Metacritic gives the film a score of 64/100 based on reviews from 26 critics, indicating "generally favorable reviews".

David Rooney of The Hollywood Reporter described Myers's film as a "sloppy kiss on an entertainment industry maverick" and called it "brisk", "entertaining", and "somewhat scattered". 
Justin Chang of Variety wrote: "It’s an affectionate, sometimes downright slobbery career salute with a soft, unexamined center — a moving experience for all involved, no doubt, but one of limited interest outside the celebrity bubble it depicts." Mark Adams of Screen Daily'' described the work as "warm-hearted", "enjoyably fluffy", and "a genially non-critical film that leaves audiences with a smile".

References

External links
 
 

2013 films
2013 documentary films
American documentary films
Documentary films about businesspeople
2013 directorial debut films
Works by Mike Myers
2010s English-language films
2010s American films